The Regina Mundi Cathedral (literally the "Cathedral of the Queen of the World in Bujumbura") is Catholic church in the city of Bujumbura, the former capital of the African country of Burundi.

It functions as the headquarters of the Metropolitan Archdiocese of Bujumbura (Latin: Archidioecesis Buiumburaensis) that was created on November 25, 2006 by Pope Benedict XVI through the bull Cum ad aptius.

Follow the Roman or Latin rite and is included in the ecclesiastical province of Bujumbura. It is under the pastoral responsibility of Archbishop Evariste Ngoyagoye.

Mass times: 
            Sunday:
            6am-7am,7.30am-8.30am,
            10am-11.45am
            12noon-1pm,
            5.30pm-6.30pm
            Monday-friday:
            12noon-1pm

See also
Roman Catholicism in Burundi

References

Roman Catholic cathedrals in Burundi
Buildings and structures in Bujumbura